The 2016–17 Israeli Women's Cup (Gvia HaMedina Nashim) was the 19th season of Israel's women's nationwide football cup competition. The competition began on 29 November 2016 with 4 first round matches.
 
ASA Tel Aviv University won the cup, beating Maccabi Kishronot Hadera 2–1 in the final.

Results

First round

Quarter-finals

Semi-finals

Final

Notes

References

External links
2016–17 State Cup Women Israeli Football Association  

 
 
 

 
Israel Women's Cup seasons
cup
Israel